Bowen Creek may refer to:

Bowen Creek (Bourbeuse River tributary), a stream in Missouri
Bowen Creek (Montana), a stream in Montana